The Illinois Fighting Illini softball team represents University of Illinois at Urbana–Champaign in NCAA Division I college softball.  The team participates in the Big Ten Conference. The Fighting Illini are currently led by head coach Tyra Perry. The team plays its home games at Eichelberger Field located on the university's campus.

History

Coaching history

Coaching staff

Notable players

Awards
Big Ten Coach of the Year
Terri Sullivan, 2010

References

 
Big Ten Conference softball

External links